Benzonitrile is the chemical compound with the formula , abbreviated PhCN.  This aromatic organic compound is a colorless liquid with a sweet bitter almond odour.  It is mainly used as a precursor to the resin benzoguanamine.

Production
 + 3/2  +  →  + 
In the laboratory it can be prepared by the dehydration of benzamide or benzaldehyde oxime or by the Rosenmund–von Braun reaction using cuprous cyanide or NaCN/DMSO and bromobenzene.

Applications

Laboratory uses
Benzonitrile is a useful solvent and a versatile precursor to many derivatives.  It reacts with amines to afford N-substituted benzamides after hydrolysis.  It is a precursor to diphenylketimine  (b.p. 151 °C, 8 mm Hg) via reaction with phenylmagnesium bromide followed by methanolysis.

Benzonitrile forms coordination complexes with transition metals that are both soluble in organic solvents and conveniently labile. The benzonitrile ligands are readily displaced by stronger ligands, making benzonitrile complexes useful synthetic intermediates.

History
Benzonitrile was reported by Hermann Fehling in 1844. He found the compound as a product from the thermal dehydration of ammonium benzoate. He deduced its structure from the already known analogue reaction of ammonium formate yielding hydrogen cyanide (formonitrile). He also coined the name benzonitrile which gave the name to all the group of nitriles.

In 2018, benzonitrile was reported to be detected in the interstellar medium.

References

External links

Aromatic solvents
Phenyl compounds
Benzonitriles